Glebovka is a rural locality (a village) in Borisoglebskoye Rural Settlement, Muromsky District, Vladimir Oblast, Russia. The population was 28 as of 2010.

Geography 
Glebovka is located 23 km north of Murom (the district's administrative centre) by road. Varezh is the nearest rural locality.

References 

Rural localities in Muromsky District
Muromsky Uyezd